Killashandra railway station in County Cavan, Ireland was the terminus station at the end of the Midland Great Western Railway seven mile branch from Crossdoney.

See also
List of closed railway stations in Ireland

References 

 
 Ordnance Survey of Ireland Discovery Series 1:50,000 map no. 34 shows the station locale.

Disused railway stations in County Cavan
Railway stations opened in 1886
Railway stations closed in 1955